Brett Edward Kelly (born 30 October 1993) is a Canadian actor known for his role as Thurman Merman in the 2003 film Bad Santa.

He appeared in Like Mike 2: Streetball, The Sandlot 2, Unaccompanied Minors, Trick 'r Treat, and reprised his role in the 2016 sequel Bad Santa 2.

Kelly was born in Vancouver, British Columbia and lives in Surrey, British Columbia.

Filmography

Awards and nominations

References

External links
 

1993 births
Living people
21st-century Canadian male actors
Canadian male child actors
Canadian male film actors
Canadian male television actors
Male actors from Vancouver
People from Surrey, British Columbia
University of British Columbia alumni